Garðar Bergmann Gunnlaugsson (born 7 September 1983) is an Icelandic footballer who plays for ÍA Akranes in the Úrvalsdeild karla. He is the younger brother of Arnar Gunnlaugsson and Bjarki Gunnlaugsson.

Club career
Garðar was born in Akranes in western Iceland in 1983. He started his football career playing for his local team ÍA Akranes before moving to Valur in 2004. In 2007, he signed with Swedish club IFK Norrköping before moving, in August 2008, to Bulgarian side CSKA Sofia. He signed a three-year contract at Sofia, becoming the first Icelandic footballer to play in the Bulgarian A PFG when he made his debut in a match against PFC Pirin Blagoevgrad.

On 18 January 2010, Garðar officially terminated his contract with CSKA Sofia before signing for Austrian side LASK Linz in February 2010, making his debut for LASK in April due to groin injuries. In July 2010 Garðar signed a 2-year contract with German side SpVgg Unterhaching, but left the club after one year, returning to ÍA Akranes where he had begun his career.

In November 2018, Garðar signed with Valur. In August 2019, he announced that he would miss the rest of the season due to a slipped disc in his lower back and that it was unlikely that he would continue his football career.

In June 2020, Gunnlaugsson returned to the pitch, after signing with 2. deild karla side Kári. In May 2020, 39-year old Gunnlaugsson signed with his former club, ÍA Akranes, in the top level men's football league in Iceland.

International career
Garðar has played for Iceland U-19 and U-21 but did not make his debut for the senior team until 13 January 2016 in a friendly against Finland.

Personal life
He was married to model Ásdís Rán Gunnarsdóttir with whom he has a daughter and a son. They divorced in 2012.

References

External links

1986 births
Living people
Gardar Gunnlaugsson
Gardar Gunnlaugsson
Gardar Gunnlaugsson
Gardar Gunnlaugsson
Gardar Gunnlaugsson
Gardar Gunnlaugsson
PFC CSKA Sofia players
IFK Norrköping players
Dunfermline Athletic F.C. players
LASK players
SpVgg Unterhaching players
Gardar Gunnlaugsson
Gardar Gunnlaugsson
Austrian Football Bundesliga players
Scottish Premier League players
First Professional Football League (Bulgaria) players
Allsvenskan players
Superettan players
Expatriate footballers in Austria
Gardar Gunnlaugsson
Expatriate footballers in Bulgaria
Gardar Gunnlaugsson
Expatriate footballers in Sweden
Gardar Gunnlaugsson
Expatriate footballers in Scotland
Gardar Gunnlaugsson
Expatriate footballers in Germany
3. Liga players
Association football forwards